Pertti Jantunen, born 25 June 1952, is a Finnish football manager and a former footballer.

Club career 
Jantunen played for Reipas Lahti in the Finnish premier division Mestaruussarja before joining CD Málaga in 1977 as the first ever Finnish footballer in Spain. In 1979, he was signed by Bristol City. Jantunen was the first Finn playing the top level in England. He also played for IFK Eskilstuna and Västerås SK in Sweden.

International career 
Jantunen was capped 26 times for Finland, making his international debut in September 1975 against the Netherlands in Nijmegen.

References 

1952 births
Living people
Sportspeople from Lahti
Association football midfielders
Finnish footballers
Finnish football managers
Finland international footballers
Bristol City F.C. players
CD Málaga footballers
Västerås SK Fotboll players
IFK Eskilstuna players
Mestaruussarja players
English Football League players
Segunda División players
Finnish expatriate footballers
Expatriate footballers in England
Expatriate footballers in Spain
Expatriate footballers in Sweden
Reipas Lahti players